The Unknown Purple is a lost 1923 American silent mystery film that was written and directed by Roland West.

Plot
After his release from prison, an inventor develops an eerie purple light that renders him invisible, enabling him to seek revenge on his unfaithful wife and his crooked business partner.

Cast

Production
Film historian Scott MacQueen cited "The Vanishing Men", a treatment West had targeted for film in 1921, as the inspiration for the film. In that way, it’s also inspired by H.G. Wells’ novel The Invisible Man, which wouldn’t get a proper adaptation until a decade later in 1933.
The film was adapted from a stage play which was written by Roland West and Carlyle Moore. Comedian Johnny Arthur made his feature-length debut in The Unknown Purple.

Release
The Unknown Purple was released in October 1923.

Reception
In a contemporary review, Variety described the film as an "exceptionally well-made picture - among the best of its type - a mystery." The review praised the photography of Oliver Marsh and the acting by Henry Walthall and Alice Lake.

References

Bibliography

External links

Advertisement at silenthollywood.com

1923 films
American black-and-white films
American films based on plays
American silent feature films
Films directed by Roland West
1920s science fiction films
Lost American films
American mystery films
1923 lost films
Lost science fiction films
1920s American films
Silent mystery films
Silent science fiction films